Jorge Imanol Almaguer (born September 21, 2000) is an American professional soccer player who plays as a midfielder.

Honors
North Texas SC
USL League One Regular Season Title: 2019
USL League One Championship: 2019

References

External links
 
 Imanol Almaguer at FC Dallas

2000 births
Living people
American soccer players
Association football midfielders
Las Vegas Lights FC players
North Texas SC players
Soccer players from Dallas
USL League One players